San Pablo Tacachico is a municipality in the La Libertad department of El Salvador.

Municipalities of the La Libertad Department (El Salvador)